Beaver Township is a township in Decatur County, Kansas, USA.  As of the 2000 census, its population was 86.

Geography
According to the USGS, it contains one cemetery, Cedar Bluffs.

References
 USGS Geographic Names Information System (GNIS)

External links
 US-Counties.com
 City-Data.com

Townships in Decatur County, Kansas
Townships in Kansas